Maloriazantseve is an urban-type settlement in Sievierodonetsk Raion (district) in Luhansk Oblast of eastern Ukraine. Population: 

Until 18 July 2020, Maloriazantseve was located in Popasna Raion. The raion was abolished in July 2020 as part of the administrative reform of Ukraine, which reduced the number of raions of Luhansk Oblast to eight, of which only four were controlled by the government. The area of Popasna Raion was merged into Sievierodonetsk Raion.

Demographics
Native language distribution as of the Ukrainian Census of 2001:
 Ukrainian: 74.06%
 Russian: 25.74%
 other languages: 0.2%

References

Urban-type settlements in Sievierodonetsk Raion
Sievierodonetsk Raion